Events in the year 1927 in Brazil.

Incumbents

Federal government 
 President: Washington Luís 
 Vice President: Fernando de Melo Viana

Governors 
 Alagoas: Pedro da Costa Rego
 Amazonas: Ifigênio Ferreira de Sales
 Bahia: Góis Calmon
 Ceará: José Moreira da Rocha
 Goiás: Brasil Caiado
 Maranhão: José Magalhães de Almeida
 Mato Grosso: Mário Correia da Costa
 Minas Gerais: Antônio Carlos Ribeiro de Andrada
 Pará: Dionísio Bentes
 Paraíba: João Suassuna
 Paraná: Caetano Munhoz da Rocha
 Pernambuco: Estácio Coimbra
 Piauí: Matias Olímpio de Melo
 Rio Grande do Norte: José Augusto Bezerra de Medeiros
 Rio Grande do Sul: Antônio Augusto Borges de Medeiros
 Santa Catarina:
 São Paulo: 
 Sergipe:

Vice governors 
 Rio Grande do Norte:
 São Paulo:

Events 
11 June - The Brazilian submarine Humaytá is launched at the Odero-Terni-Orlando shipyard at La Spezia, Italy.
date unknown - The Brazilian Chess Championship is held for the first time, in Rio de Janeiro.

Arts and culture

Books
Oswald de Andrade - Estrela de absinto

Films 
Rien que les heures, directed by Alberto Cavalcanti on location in France

Births 
3 March - Teixeirinha, musician (died 1985)
23 March - Osvaldo Lacerda, composer (died 2011)
5 June — Ladjane Bandeira, journalist and artist (died 1999)
16 June - Ariano Suassuna, playwright, author (died 2014)
13 August - Péricles Azambuja, historian, writer and journalist (died 2012)
4 September – Antônio Carlos Magalhães, diplomat and politician (died 2007)
13 September - Laura Cardoso, Brazilian actress
29 September
 Cid Moreira, Brazilian journalist and TV presenter
 Adhemar da Silva, athlete (died 2001)
14 November - Fernando Torres, actor (died 2008)

Deaths 
February - Paulo do Rio Branco, French-born rugby player, son of José Paranhos, Baron of Rio Branco (born 1876)
27 April - Carlos de Campos, politician and incumbent president of the state of São Paulo (born 1866)
12 July - José Augusto do Amaral, Brazilian serial killer (born 1871)

References

See also 
1927 in Brazilian football

 
1920s in Brazil
Years of the 20th century in Brazil
Brazil
Brazil